Scipio Moorhead (active c. 1773-after 1775) was an enslaved African-American artist who lived in Boston, Massachusetts. Moorhead is known through the contemporary African-American poet Phillis Wheatley's poem, dedicated "To S. M. a young African Painter, on seeing his Works", published in Poems on Various Subjects, Religious and Moral, 1773. His full name was learned from period marginalia.

Moorhead was a slave of the Reverend John Moorhead of Boston, Massachusetts. His talents for drawing were tutored by the reverend's wife Sarah Moorhead, who was an art teacher. Although a slave, Scipio Moorhead enjoyed many of the rights of free workers. No original work by Scipio has survived, but he may be the person referred to the a Boston News-Letter advertisement on January 7, 1773, which spoke of a "negro artist... A negro of extraordinary genius."

It is possible that the copperplate engraving of Phillis Wheatley that adorns much of her published poetry is his creation. In the 19th century Wheatley's fame was revived by Massachusetts abolitionists and many stories about her were recovered through oral history, but Moorhead was never mentioned, so the attribution to him is uncertain; it was first publicly suggested by the Wheatley scholar William H. Robinson in 1984. However, it has been recognized that the portrait is extremely unusual. It resembles contemporary portraits by the famous Bostonian painter John Singleton Copley, but unlike any of Copley's work, it portrays a woman writing a poem and deep in thought. The novelty of the portrait was recognized and imitated by Bostonian printers when it was engraved for an edition of Wheatley's poetry in 1773, but the artist's name was never mentioned. It is the first frontispiece depicting a woman writer in American history, and possibly the first ever portrait of an American woman in the act of writing.

Scipio was auctioned in January 1775 as part of an estate sale. The advertised location of the slave auction, near the Liberty Tree, was deplored by the 19th century abolition movement. In the 1780s slaves in Massachusetts successfully sued for freedom which led to a general abolition, but it is unknown if Scipio was ever freed, as his buyer was unrecorded and no record of his whereabouts after 1775 has been located.

See also
List of enslaved people

References 

1700s births
18th-century American slaves
18th-century American painters
18th-century American male artists
Year of death unknown
African-American painters